Ron is a taluka headquarters in Gadag district, Karnataka in India. Of historical importance, the town was termed Dronapur in ancient times. The temples are believed to be constructed by the ancient architect and warrior-priest Dronacharya.

Bhimsen Joshi was born in Ron in his mother’s house. Giraddi Govindraj, R. C. Hiremath (Kannada Scholar), Rajshekhar Bhoosanoormath, B. V. Mallapur (Kannada Scholar) and Alur Venkatrao were born in Ron Taluka.

Historical monuments at Ron
There are many historic monuments in the town of Ron, including: 
 Sadguru Siddhaaroodha Swaami Temple
 Anantashayana temple
 Eeshvara Temple near Anantashayana temple
 Eeshvara Temple
 Kalla Gudi (stone temple) in Eeshwar Nagar
 Lokanaatha Temple
 Mallikaarjuna Temple
 Paarshvanaatha Jain Temple
 Somalingeshvara Temple near the Tank
 Shree Veerabhadreshwar temple is the main deity of Ron and the annual car festival takes place here in the month of May
 Shivaanand Math on Gajendragad Road

Tourism in Ron Taluka
Siddharudha Swami temple - the famous temple/ matha known as Siddharudha Matha at Ron. On the eve of Ramanavami, the birth anniversary of Shri Siddhaaroodha Swaami is celebrated by pulling the famous carved car of the temple. Annadaana is performed for thousands of devotees on this day. Seven days of Saptaha is conducted at this temple.

 Itagi Bhimambika temple - The famous temple known as Itagi Bheemavva at Itagi, is about 13 km away from Kalkaleshwara temple, Gajendragad. Thousands of believers throng everyday to this place to get their wishes fulfilled by this female deity. They tie coconuts and wish for their desires to be fulfilled. There is a historical Shiva temple here.
 Sudi,- is a panchayat town in the Gadag District of Karnataka, India. At one time it was a key town of the Kalyani Chalukyas during 1000 AD. It is famous for rare stone carved monuments like twin towered temple and large well built of stone and carvings, and few other structural temples. For long time these amazing structures were abandoned, but recently they caught the eye of the Indian Archeological Department.
 
 Belavanaki - History of Belavanaki goes back to ancient time. According to the Ron inscription introduces the Ganga subordinate Mahamandalika Butayya as the governor of Gangavadi-96,000,Belvola-300, Puligere-300 provinces in Saka 864 (=A..D. 942) while his Kurtakoti inscription mentions the chief as holding charge of the same provinces in Saka 868 (=A.D. 946) therefore scriptures of Rastrakuta and Chalukyas of Kalyana dynasties shows the existence of this village goes back to ninth and 10th century and it is also ruled by Maratha king Shivaji and Peshwas of 17th and 18th century. This village name may be derived from old name of ‘Belavala-nadu 300’(Deccan Plains) or Belvola-300 means region consist of 300 villages and also mean fertile land. in Belavanaki the statue of Veerabadra is consider to be best kind sculpture in Karnataka, therefore it has mentioned in Dharwad District Gazetter (English-M R Palande.1959.Kannada-Suryanath Kamath.1995).It is also a birthplace of S. R. Hiremath social activist and Founder President of Samaja Parivarthana Samudaya, National Committee for Protection of Natural Resources and India Development Service.

Nearest tourist places

 Banashankari Temple is a Hindu temple located near Badami, in Bagalkot District, Karnataka, India. The temple is dedicated to the Shakambari (also known as Banashankari Amma), an incarnation of the Goddess Parvati.
 Badami , formerly known as Vatapi, is a panchayat town in the Bagalkot District of Karnataka, India. It was the regal capital of the Badami Chalukyas from 540 to 757 AD. It is famous for rock cut and other structural temples. It is located in a ravine at the foot of a rugged, red sandstone outcrop that surrounds Agastya lake.
 Aihole is a town in the Bagalkot district of Karnataka, India. Early inscriptions call this town Ayyavole and Aryapura. Aihole has its own historical significance and is called the cradle of Hindu rock architecture. Many temples and caves of historical importance can be found at Aihole. It is a very popular tourist spot in north Karnataka.
 Pattadakal - World Heritage Site is a town in the Indian state of Karnataka famous for its group of monuments that are the culmination of earliest experiments in the so-called vesara style of Hindu temple architecture. The temples were built in the 8th century CE. The uniqueness of this place derives from the presence of both the Dravidian architecture of the South and the Nagara or the Northern (Indo-Aryan) styles of temple architecture.
 Mahakuta Group of Temples  is 16 km away from Badami. It is an archaeological site, also called Mahakoota, with several temples from the Early Chalukya period.

Geography

See also

 North Karnataka
 Tourism in North Karnataka
 Gajendragarh
 Sudi
 Itagi Bhimambika
 Naregal, Gadag
 Kuknur
 Gadag District

References

Cities and towns in Gadag district